The 2018 Shanghai Dragons season was the first season of the Shanghai Dragons's existence in the Overwatch League. Shanghai did not record a single win in the entire 2018 Overwatch League season, giving the team a record of 0–40; this marked the worst single-season record in professional sports history.

Preceding offseason 
On October 31, Dragons revealed their Overwatch League roster, consisting of the following eight members:
Lu "Diya" Weida
Fang "uNdeAD" Chao
Jing "Roshan" Wenhao
Liu "Xushu" Junjie
Xu "Freefeel" Peixuan
Chen "Fiveking" Zhaoyu
Cheng "Altering" Yage
Wu "MG" Dongjian

Three weeks later, on November 20, Shanghai Dragons announced their coaching staff, including head coach Chen "U4" Congshan.

Regular season

Review 
Shanghai Dragons' first regular season OWL match was a 1–3 loss to the San Francisco Shock. Unfortunately, this result would become a trend for the Dragons for quite some time. The team did not record a win in Stage 1, going . On February 13, 2018, disappointed by their Stage 1 record, the Dragons signed 4 new players in hopes to improve their Stage 2 chances; most notably including the league's first female player, South Korean Kim "Geguri" Se-yeon.

Amidst a disaster of a season, Shanghai went through three different head coaches. The Dragons finished the season with a 0–40 record and a -120 map differential, having not won a single match. This marked the worst single-season record in professional sports history.

Final roster

Transactions 
Transactions of/for players on the roster during the 2018 regular season:
On February 14, Dragons signed Chon "Ado" Gi-hyeon, Kim "Geguri" Se-yeon, Lee "Fearless" Eui-seok, and He "Sky" Junjuan.
On March 29, Dragons released Fang "Undead" Chao.
On April 4, Dragons signed Kim "Daemin" Dae-min.
On June 5, Dragons released Wu "MG" Dongjian.

Standings

Record by stage

League

Game log

Preseason

Regular season

References 

2018 Overwatch League seasons by team
Shanghai Dragons
Shanghai Dragons seasons